Fourteen is a play by Alice Gerstenberg. This one-act social satire was first performed October 7, 1919 at the Maitland Playhouse, 332 Stockton Street, San Francisco, on a bill with three other one-act plays. The San Francisco Chronicle remarked that it "gayly lampoons the question of dinner entertainments". Arthur Maitland's company had just moved into a new 200-seat theater from its previous incarnation as the St. Francis Little Theatre Club in the Colonial Ballroom of the St. Francis Hotel.

The play was originally published in the February 1920 issue of The Drama magazine. It is now a public domain work and may be performed without royalties.

Characters 

Mrs. Horace Pringle, a woman of fashion.
Elaine, her debutante daughter.
 Dunham, the butler or maid.

Synopsis  
Mrs. Pringle is preparing to host a dinner party to introduce her daughter, Elaine, to the city's most eligible bachelor, Oliver Farnsworth. Illness and a blizzard force some guests to cancel and the three characters are compelled to try to salvage the evening and the dinner-table layout.

Reception
Writing in The Drama magazine, J. Vandervoort Sloan described Gerstenberg as "a progressive young playwright, possibly the best-known and most widely be-played by amateur groups in America" and Fourteen as belonging "in the 'a' class of her plays". A reviewer for the American Library Association called it an "exemplary social farce".

The play was among those "unqualifiedly recommended" for high-school productions in front of "mixed audiences" by a New Jersey public school drama adviser in 1923. The adviser described it as "portraying the contretemps of a dinner party".

The play has continued to appeal to theater companies and audiences, with several modern productions. Reviewing a 2007 production in the New York Times, Anne Midgette described Fourteen as delightfully dated.

References

External links

Performances and videos
Fourteen - SUDS
Fourteen by Alice Gerstenberg
Youtube.com
Youtube.com

Online script links
Theatrehistory.com

1919 plays